Giardinelli is a surname. Notable people with the surname include:

Prince Gaetano Starrabba di Giardinelli (born 1932), former racing driver from Italy
Mempo Giardinelli (born 1947), Argentine novelist and academic
Robert Giardinelli (1914–1996), noted musical instrument craftsman